Handford is a surname. Notable people with the surname include:

Alick Handford (1869–1935), English cricketer
Clive Handford (born 1937), Anglican bishop
Frank Handford, English rugby union player
James Handford (1890–1948), English cricketer
Martin Handford (born 1956), English writer and illustrator
Peter Handford (1919–2007), English audio engineer
Phil Handford (born 1964), English footballer
Richard Handford, British television producer
Sanders Handford (1858–1917), English-born American cricketer

In fiction
Julius Handford, an alias for John Harmon in Dickens's Our Mutual Friend
Mr. Handford, a character in Sesame Street

See also
Hanford (disambiguation)